Live at the Shepherds Bush Empire is the fourth album, and the first live album, by Ezio, recorded live at the Shepherds Bush Empire in London, England on 5 March 1999 and released later that year.
Live at The Junction is the second live DVD/video recorded by Ezio, released in 2007.

Credits 
Ezio – guitar, vocals
Booga – guitar
Lidia Cascarino – bass
Peter Van Hooke – drums
Produced by Salami Records
Directed by Phil Gaze
Recorded and mixed by Graham Bonnett

Track listing
All songs written by Ezio Lunedei except where noted.

"Angel Song" – 5:46
"The Oranges Song" – 4:27
"Go" – 4:53
"Alex" – 5:54
"At that moment"  - 7:01
"Sweet Thing / Tuesday Night" – 10:55 (Van Morrison), (Lunedei)
"Deeper" – 4:45
"Just to talk to you again" – 4:02
"The further we stretch" – 5:15
"One more walk round the dancefloor" – 4:55
"Saxon Street" – 10:28

See also
1999 in music

Ezio (band) albums
1999 live albums
Shepherd's Bush